Locquirec is a commune in the Finistère department of Brittany in north-western France.

Geography
The village is build around the church and the marina. The town of Locquirec is home to several beaches: Port beach, in the center of the village, Pors Ar Villec, the White Sands, the Moulin de la Rive, the Fond de la Baie beach. Whatever the direction of the wind, you are sure to find a sheltered beach. Port beach is very popular thanks to its exposure to the south-east, which is rare in northern Brittany. The town also has fairly high cliffs, up to fifty meters, forming peaks (Pointe du Château, Pointe du Corbeau, Pointe northeast of Moulin de la Rive).

The bay of Locquirec is formed by the mouth of the coastal river Douron, which separates the two departments of Finistère and Côtes d'Armor, Locquirec being on its left bank and Plestin-les-Grèves on its right bank.

Toponymy
From the Breton lok which means hermitage (cf.: Locminé), and Guirec a Breton saint.

Population
Inhabitants of Locquirec are called in French Locquirécois.

International relations
Locquirec is twinned with:
  Drumshanbo, Co. Leitrim, Ireland

Personalities
 Academician Michel Mohrt (1914-2011), born in Morlaix, owned a vacation home there, where he stayed regularly.
 François Seité (1923-1944), born in Locquirec, officer of the Free French Forces, Companion of the Liberation.
 Léon Fleuriot, historian and linguist, specialist in Celtic languages (1923-1987), born in Morlaix and who owned a vacation home there, is buried there.
 Historian Jean-Christophe Cassard (1951-2013) is buried there. Born in La Rochelle, originally from the Locquirec region by his mother, he lived there.
 The musician Pierre Sangra, born in 1959 in Fontenay-sous-Bois, owns a family home there where he regularly resides.
 The singer-songwriter Thomas Fersen, born in Paris in 1963, lives there.
 The singer and musician Jean-Pierre Riou, born in Morlaix in 1963, leader of the group Red Cardell, lives there.

See also
Communes of the Finistère department

References

External links
Official website 
Tourism In Locquirec

Mayors of Finistère Association 

Communes of Finistère
Seaside resorts in France